Parathion S is an organophosphate related to the organophosphate insecticide paraoxon and parathion. It's the structural isomer of parathion. Parathion S is a potent acetylcholinesterase inhibitor.

See also
Paraoxon
Parathion
Diisopropyl paraoxon
Ro 3-0419
Ro 3-0422

References

Acetylcholinesterase inhibitors
Organothiophosphate esters
Ethyl esters
Nitrobenzenes